"A Blossom Fell" is a popular song written by Howard Barnes, Harold Cornelius, and Dominic John and published in 1954.

The best-known version was recorded by Nat King Cole. The recording was released by Capitol Records as catalog number 3095. The B-side was "If I May." The record first reached the Billboard magazine charts on April 27, 1955, and lasted 20 weeks on the chart, peaking at #2. (Note that in this era, Billboard combined data for both sides of two-sided hits, so the #2 status applies to the combination of "A Blossom Fell" and "If I May").

Nat King Cole recorded the song again for his album The Nat King Cole Story (1961).

Other versions
In the UK "A Blossom Fell" was even more popular with 3 cover versions to reach the UK charts: The first one was by Dickie Valentine who entered the UK listings on 18 February 1955 and climbed up to the # 10 spot. One week later the version by Nat King Cole appeared and outsold Valentines recording by reaching #3. Finally Ronnie Hilton's version charted at #10 a few weeks later.
Tony Bennett - Recorded June 9, 1955.
Diana Krall - All for You: A Dedication to the Nat King Cole Trio (1996)
Sue Raney - Songs for a Raney Day (1960).

References

1954 songs
1955 singles
Songs with lyrics by Howard Barnes
Nat King Cole songs